Országh is a surname of Hungarian origin, meaning "country, land" (today spelled ország). It may refer to the following people:
Ádám Országh
László Országh
Pavol Országh Hviezdoslav
Vítězslav Országh
Vladimír Országh

Hungarian-language surnames
Czech-language surnames
Slovak-language surnames